Hermann Dostal (1874 in Mährisch-Ostrau (today Moravská Ostrava) – 20 December 1930 in Vienna) was an Austrian composer and arranger.

As the son of a military musician, he was himself the military Kapellmeister of Austrian-Hungarian infantry regiments in Hungary, Slovakia and South Moravia. He served in various military bands of the Danube Monarchy, among others with Franz Lehár, whose successor he became in 1904 with the infantry regiment no. 26. Hermann Dostal was the uncle of the composer Nico Dostal. His grave is in the Vienna Central Cemetery.

Works 
 Eine göttliche Nacht (1910), musical burlesque, 1 act, Julius Wilhelm
 Das geborgte Schloß (1911), operette, 3 acts, Karl Lindau/Georg Verö
 Der fliegende Rittmeister. (1912), operette, 1 act (including the famous ), Bela Jenbach/Leo Stein
 Urschula (1916), musical farce, 3 acts, Bela Jenbach/Julius Wilhelm
 Nimm mich mit! (1919), operette, 3 acts, Heinrich von Waldberg/Alfred Maria Willner (über 150 Aufführungen)
 Graf Sandor, 3 acts, Leopold Krenn/Karl Lindau

References

External links 
 
 

1874 births
1930 deaths
19th-century classical composers
20th-century classical composers
20th-century Czech male musicians
Austrian classical composers
Austrian male classical composers
Austrian operetta composers
Burials at the Vienna Central Cemetery
Military music composers
Military musicians
Moravian-German people
Musicians from Ostrava
19th-century Czech male musicians
Austro-Hungarian musicians